The Samsung Galaxy E Series market out of two smartphones:

References

Samsung Galaxy
Android (operating system) devices
Samsung mobile phones